Pettus Independent School District is a public school district based in the community of Pettus, Texas (USA).   In addition to Pettus, the district serves the communities of Tuleta, Tulsita, and Normanna. Located in Bee County, a small portion of the district extends into Karnes County.

Schools
Pettus ISD has two campuses - 
Pettus Secondary School (Grades 7-12)
Pettus Elementary School (Grades K-6).

In 2009, the school district was rated "academically acceptable" by the Texas Education Agency.

References

External links
 

School districts in Bee County, Texas
School districts in Karnes County, Texas